Reham Nayyar Khan (born 3 April 1973) is a British-Pakistani journalist, author, and filmmaker from Baffa, Pakistan. She is a former wife of Imran Khan, who later became Prime Minister of Pakistan in 2018, The publication of her memoir shortly before the 2018 Pakistani general election led to claims that its publication was intended to damage Imran Khan's electoral prospects. Khan married Mirza Bilal on December 23, 2022.

Personal life
Reham was born to Nayyar Ramzan, a Pakistani physician. She is ethnically of Pashtun origins from the Lughmani clan, a sub-clan of the Swati tribe. She is fluent in four languages which include English, Urdu, Pashto and her ancestral Hindko. Her family hails from the town of Baffa, lying 15 km west of Mansehra in Khyber Pakhtunkhwa province. Her parents moved to Libya in the late 1960s, where Reham was born in Ajdabiya in 1973. She has one sister and one brother.

She is the niece of Abdul Hakeem Khan who was a former governor of the Khyber-Pakhtunkhwa province and former Chief Justice of Peshawar High Court.

Reham has a Bachelor Degree in Education from Jinnah College for Women, Peshawar.

She married Ejaz Rehman (Spelling variants include Ijaz), her first cousin and British psychiatrist, when she was 19. Following their divorce, Khan began working as a broadcast journalist. She has three children who have lived with her since the divorce.

On 6 January 2015, Imran Khan confirmed his marriage to Reham which ended on 30 October 2015 in a divorce.

On 2 January 2022, Khan revealed on Twitter that she had narrowly escaped a gun attack in Islamabad when returning home from her nephew's wedding. She said her car was shot at and two men on a motorcycle and they held the vehicle at gunpoint.

Career

Reham started her career in 2006 hosting shows on Legal TV. In 2007, Reham began presenting for Sunshine Radio Hereford and Worcester. In 2008, Khan joined BBC as weather girl.

In 2013, Khan came to Pakistan and joined Pakistani news channel News One (Pakistani TV channel). She later joined Aaj TV. In 2014, following a brief stint at PTV, she joined Dawn News presenting the current affairs show In Focus. Following a brief hiatus in early 2015, she resumed her work with a new show on Dawn. The Reham Khan Show, a programme celebrating Pakistani heroes, debuted in May 2015. In December 2015, she started a new talk show by the name of Tabdeeli on Neo TV. Tabdeeli (change) is also a political slogan of Imran Khan, her former husband. Reham left Neo TV in June 2016.

Reham has also produced a Pakistani film Janaan, the romantic comedy set in Swat which premiered on the occasion of Eid ul Adha on 13 September 2016.

Bibliography

References

External links
 

1973 births
Living people
Pakistani women journalists
Pashtun people
Libyan people of Pakistani descent
Pakistani television talk show hosts
Pakistani emigrants to the United Kingdom
Pakistani expatriates in Libya
Naturalised citizens of the United Kingdom
Dawn Media Group people
Pakistani memoirists
BBC newsreaders and journalists
Pakistani writers
Pakistani journalists
Women memoirists
British women television journalists
British women radio presenters
Pakistani women radio presenters